The Leeds municipal elections were held on Thursday 7 May 1959, with one third of the seats and extra vacancies in East Hunslet and Stanningley up for election.

Mirroring their national recovery, the Conservatives achieved a 3% swing to win the popular vote and make the only gain of the night in the marginal Wortley. The Liberals fielded their greatest number of candidates since 1951, and as such received their highest vote since then. Turnout fell by just under a percentage point from the year before to 36.3%.

Election result

The result had the following consequences for the total number of seats on the council after the elections:

Ward results

References

Leeds City Council election
1959
Leeds City Council election
1950s in Leeds